George Felt (February 28, 1601 – ) was a 17th-century English emigrant to the New England Colonies. He is considered a founder of Charlestown, Massachusetts and is one of the three main early settlers of North Yarmouth, Massachusetts Bay Colony (now Yarmouth, Maine), along with John Cousins and William Royal.

Arrival in the Thirteen Colonies
George Felt arrived in Salem, Massachusetts, in Fall 1628, aboard the Ship Abigail with John Endecott, regarded as one of the Fathers of Anglo-Saxon White Puritan New England. Felt was born at Leighton Buzzard, Bedfordshire, England, and is considered the first of the Felt family in America. He went to Charlestown, Massachusetts, the following year where he helped form a government with thirty-three other colonists in 1633. He moved north to what was then North Yarmouth, Maine (now Yarmouth) in 1643. He purchased 300 acres of land at Broad Cove from John Phillips, a Welshman.

Felt later owned a lot at the foot of the northern end of Pleasant Street in Yarmouth, adjacent to Stony Brook, in an area that became known as Grantville.

In 1684, military officer and fellow Englishman Walter Gendall claimed to own all of Felt's two thousand acres in Casco Bay. He had purchased one hundred acres from him in 1680.

Personal life
Felt's family in Bedfordshire, England, went by the family name Felce. He called himself George Felch, however, when he moved to America. He began to be known as George Felt in his later years.

In 1630, Felt married 29-year-old Elizabeth Wilkinson (1601–1694), with whom he had six children: Elizabeth (born ), George Jr. (1638–1676), Mary (1639–1725), Moses I (1641–1650), Aaron and Moses II (1651–1733).

Around 1649, the family moved back to Malden, Massachusetts, just as it was being incorporated into a city. They returned to Casco Bay in 1667, shortly after which Felt bought 2,000 more acres of land from Phillips.

Conflicts forged by King Philip's War caused the Felts to abandon their home. In 1676,  Felt's son and Mussel Cove resident, George Jr., was killed on Peaks Island during the conflicts. The deceased's wife of fourteen years, Londoner Phillippa Andrews, moved to Salem, Massachusetts, where she married twice (to Samuel Platt in 1682 and Thomas Nelson in 1690) before her death in 1709. She had emigrated to America with her parents in 1635.

Death
In 1684, Felt moved back to Massachusetts. He died in Malden in 1693, aged 92, with Elizabeth surviving him by one year. The couple had become the first citizens of Malden to receive town aid, such was their fall from wealth during the latter stages of their time in Maine.

References

1601 births
1693 deaths
People from Bedfordshire
People from North Yarmouth, Maine
Kingdom of England emigrants to Massachusetts Bay Colony
English emigrants
People of colonial Massachusetts
People from colonial Boston